The Boeing 737 AEW&C is a twin-engine airborne early warning and control aircraft based on the Boeing 737 Next Generation design. It is lighter than the 707-based Boeing E-3 Sentry, and has a fixed, active electronically scanned array radar antenna instead of a rotating one. It was designed for the Royal Australian Air Force (RAAF) under "Project Wedgetail" and designated E-7A Wedgetail.

The 737 AEW&C has also been selected by the Turkish Air Force (under "Project Peace Eagle", Turkish: Barış Kartalı, designated E-7T, the Republic of Korea Air Force ("Project Peace Eye", Korean: "피스 아이"), and the United Kingdom (designated Wedgetail AEW1). In April 2022, the United States Air Force announced that the E-7 will be replacing the E-3 beginning in 2027.

Design and development

The Australian Department of Defence evaluated industry proposals for airborne surveillance and early warning systems as early as 1986. Further studies led to the approval of the first phase of Project AIR 5077 in 1994.  In 1996, Australia issued a request for proposal (RFP) for the aircraft for the RAAF under Project Wedgetail, which refers to the indigenous eagle. In 1999, Australia awarded Boeing Integrated Defense Systems a contract to supply four AEW&C aircraft with options for three additional aircraft.

The 737 AEW&C is roughly similar to the 737-700ER. It uses the Northrop Grumman Electronic Systems Multi-role Electronically Scanned Array (MESA) radar. The electronically scanned AEW and surveillance radar is located on a dorsal fin on top of the fuselage, dubbed the "top hat", and is designed for minimal aerodynamic effect. The radar is capable of simultaneous air and sea search, fighter control and area search, with a maximum range of over 600 km (look-up mode). In addition, the radar antenna array is also doubled as an ELINT array, with a maximum range of over 850 km at  altitude. Radar signal processing equipment and central computer are installed directly below the antenna array.

Other modifications include ventral fins to counterbalance the radar and countermeasures mounted on the nose, wingtips and tail. In-flight refueling is via a receptacle on top of the forward fuselage. The cabin features eight operator consoles with sufficient space for four more; the Australian fleet will operate ten consoles with space for two more (four on starboard side and six on the port side).

Operational history

Australia

Australia ordered four AEW&C aircraft with options for three additional aircraft, two of which have since been taken up. The first two Wedgetails were assembled, modified and tested in Seattle, Washington, while the remainder were modified by Boeing Australia, with deliveries once set to begin in 2006,. Boeing and Northrop teamed with Boeing Australia, and BAE Systems Australia. Boeing Australia provides training, maintenance and support, BAE provides EWSP systems, Electronic Support Measures (ESM) systems and ground support systems.

On 29 June 2006, the Australian Minister for Defence, Brendan Nelson, stated that the Wedgetail was delayed despite Boeing's prior assurance that work was on schedule. Boeing announced an 18-month delay due to problems integrating radar and sensor systems, and did not expected delivery until early 2009. Additionally, Boeing incurred $770 million in charges over the delay in 2006. On 20 June 2008, Boeing announced a further delay due to integration issues with the radar and Electronic Support Measure (ESM) systems.

On 26 November 2009, Boeing delivered the first two 737 AEW&Cs to the Royal Australian Air Force (RAAF). These aircraft remained Boeing owned and operated prior to the RAAF's formal acceptance on 5 May 2010. The RAAF accepted its sixth and last 737 AEW&C on 5 June 2012. All RAAF Wedgetails are operated by No. 2 Squadron RAAF and based at RAAF Base Williamtown with a permanent detachment at RAAF Base Tindal. In November 2012, the Wedgetail achieved Initial Operational Capability.

On 1 April 2014, the first operational sortie occurred in the search for Malaysia Airlines Flight 370, helping control maritime patrol aircraft off Western Australia's coast. On 1 October 2014, a Wedgetail conducted the first Australian sortie over Iraq supporting coalition forces conducting airstrikes against the Islamic State of Iraq and the Levant (ISIL). On 26 May 2015, the Wedgetail fleet achieved final operational capability (FOC).

In November 2015, the Wedgetail performed the longest Australian command and control mission in a war zone during a 17-hour, 6-minute combat mission, requiring two air-to-air refuelings to stay aloft. Australian Wedgetail crews routinely perform 13-hour missions. In early April 2016, Rotation 5 of aircrew and maintenance personnel that had been operating the RAAF Wedgetail in the Middle East achieved a record 100 percent mission success rate in Coalition operations against ISIS. The E-7A successfully conducted all 36 missions, each lasting upwards of 12 hours, amounting to nearly 500 hours of flying for the one aircraft.

Turkey

Four Boeing 737 AEW&C Peace Eagle aircraft along with ground support systems were ordered by the Turkish Air Force, with an option for two more. Turkish Aerospace Industries (TAI) is the Peace Eagle's primary subcontractor, performing parts production, testing, aircraft assembly and conversion. Another Turkish subcontractor, HAVELSAN, is responsible for ground support elements, system analysis and software support. HAVELSAN is also the only foreign company licensed by the U.S. Government to receive critical source codes. Peace Eagle 1 was modified and tested by Boeing in the US, while Peace Eagle 2, 3 and 4 were modified and tested at TAI's facilities in Ankara, Turkey, in partnership with Boeing and several Turkish companies. In 2006, the four Peace Eagles were scheduled to be delivered in 2008.

In September 2007, Boeing completed the first Peace Eagle test flight. On 4 June 2008, it was announced that Peace Eagle 2, the second 737 AEW&C, had completed modifications; flight and mission system checks were completed in the third quarter of 2008. In 2013, Israel delivered EW equipment for the Peace Eagle under US pressure. On 21 February 2014, the first Peace Eagle, named Kuzey (meaning North), was formally accepted by the Turkish Air Force. The remaining three aircraft are named Güney (South), Doğu (East) and Batı (West). The fourth and final Peace Eagle was delivered in December 2015.

South Korea
On 7 November 2006, Boeing won a $1.6 billion contract with South Korea to deliver four aircraft by 2012. Boeing beat the other entrant, IAI Elta's Gulfstream G550-based aircraft, which was eliminated from the competition in August 2006. The first Peace Eye aircraft was delivered to Gimhae Air Base, Busan for acceptance testing on 1 August 2011 with the remaining three aircraft delivered every six months until 2012. The second aircraft was modified into an AEW&C configuration by Korea Aerospace Industries (KAI), then delivered to Gimhae Air Base on 13 December 2011. After receiving AEW&C modifications by KAI, the third aircraft was delivered on 17 May 2012 to Gimhae Air Base. The fourth aircraft was delivered on 24 October 2012.

United Kingdom
In October 2018, the British Government announced that it was in talks with Boeing and the Royal Australian Air Force about the potential for the E-7 Wedgetail to replace its E-3D fleet. The apparent decision to proceed with procurement without a competition received some criticism, with the Ministry of Defence accused of displaying favouritism towards Boeing, while Saab voiced its opposition to the "non-competitive" deal as it could offer the Erieye system mounted on Airbus A330 MRTT aircraft. On 22 March 2019, it was announced by Defence Secretary Gavin Williamson that the UK had signed a $1.98 billion deal to purchase five E-7 Wedgetails. The aircraft is to be designated as the "Wedgetail AEW1".

Airframe modification was expected to be performed by Marshall Aerospace, but it withdrew in May 2020, thus Boeing selected STS Aviation Group's UK branch on 20 May 2020. Two of the five aircraft are to be converted commercial airliners and the rest are to be new. Each conversion takes about 24 months, with work on the first aircraft starting in 2021 and the last to be completed in 2026. As of June 2020, the first Wedgetail delivery had been expected in 2023. In December 2020, Air Forces Monthly reported that the UK was considering reducing its Wedgetail purchase from five to three aircraft and stated that such a move "could often mean just one aircraft would be available for operational tasking." The 2021 Integrated Defence Review confirmed the reduced order of three aircraft. In late 2022, it was reported that initial operating capability for the aircraft had slipped to 2024. In February 2023, Air Chief Marshal Michael Wigston stated that the order of three aircraft may gradually rise to five.

United States

In February 2021 General Kenneth S. Wilsbach, the Commander of the United States Pacific Air Forces, proposed that the USAF rapidly acquire E-7s to replace the E-3s deployed to the Indo-Pacific region. In April 2021, Aviation Week & Space Technology reported that Gen. Jeffrey Harrigian, commander of U.S. Air Forces in Europe and Air Forces Africa, also voiced support for a near-term E-7 acquisition. In October 2021, the USAF published a "Notice of Contract Action" stating its intent to award Boeing a sole-source contract to study the E-7 to determine if it can meet USAF configuration standards and mandates.

On 26 April 2022, the U.S. Air Force announced that the E-7 would replace the E-3 as it "is the only platform capable of meeting the requirements for the Defense Department's tactical battle management, command and control and moving target indication capabilities within the timeframe needed..." An initial $1.2 billion contract was awarded in 2023 to develop two new US-specific variants of the E-7. A final production decision for a total fleet of 26 aircraft is planned for 2025 with the first USAF E-7 entering service in 2027.

Potential customers
Italy
In 2004, the Italian Air Force was considering the purchase of a total of 14 Wedgetail and P-8 MMA aircraft, with aircraft support to be provided by Alitalia. However, in 2008, owing to budget constraints, Italy chose not to proceed with either aircraft and chose a smaller, less expensive, interim solution in place of the P-8.

United Arab Emirates
The Wedgetail was a competitor for the United Arab Emirates' AEW&C program in 2007. In 2015, UAE selected the Saab GlobalEye over the Wedgetail and the Northrop Grumman E-2D Advanced Hawkeye.

Qatar
In 2014, Qatar stated it planned to purchase three 737 AEW&C aircraft. In 2018, Qatar decided not to proceed with the planned purchase.

NATO
In 2022, NATO issued a "Request for Information" (RFI) for a capability to replace its 14 E-3A AWACS aircraft by 2035, with an "initial operational capability" by 2031. Boeing stated that it had responded to the request, offering an E-7-based solution. Saab and Northrop Grumman also responded to the RFI, offering, respectively, the GlobalEye and E-2D Advanced Hawkeye.

Operators

 Royal Australian Air Force – six aircraft in use, designated "E-7A Wedgetail"
No. 2 Squadron

 Republic of Korea Air Force – four aircraft in use, designated "Peace Eye"; considering ordering two to three more
51st Air Control Group
271th Airborne Air Control Squadron

 Turkish Air Force – four aircraft in use; designated "E-7T Peace Eagle"
131st Squadron, AEW&C Group Command in 3rd Main Jet Base, Konya, callsign "Wiseman"

 Royal Air Force – three aircraft on order, with potentially another two in future for a total of five; designated "Wedgetail AEW1"
No. 8 Squadron

 United States Air Force - two aircraft on contract; a fleet of 26 planned

Specifications

See also

References

External links 

 Boeing 737 AEW&C page on Boeing.com
 RAAF E-7 Wedgetail page
 E-7A WEDGETAIL Airborne Early Warning & Control aircraft on airrecognition.com

737 AEWandC
2000s United States special-purpose aircraft
Twinjets
AWACS aircraft
737 AEWandC
Low-wing aircraft
Aircraft first flown in 2004